The Mad Whale is a 2017 American drama-thriller film directed by 9 different directors, which was produced by James Franco's Elysium Bandini Studios and the USC School of Cinematic Arts. The film stars Camilla Belle, Dominic Rains, Summer Phoenix and James Franco. The film was premiered on 19 October 2017 at the Heartland Film Festival.

Cast
 Camilla Belle as Isabel Wallace
 Dominic Rains as Dr. Benjamin Calhoun
 Summer Phoenix as Beatrice Price
 James Franco as Edward Fry
 Michael Weston as Tobias
 Carmen Argenziano as Dr. Withers
 Nicole Starrett as Nurse Phoebe Stokes
 Kai Lennox as The Chairman
 Alan Bagh as John / Orderly
 Vince Jolivette as Board Member
 Lori Jean Wilson as Dierdre

Reception
Shown at the Heartland Film Festival, and Newport Beach Film Festival, a student-critic from Ball State University gave the film a positive review.

References

External links
 

2010s English-language films
2017 thriller drama films
American thriller drama films
2010s American films